Pomacea catamarcensis is a South American species of freshwater snail with gills and an operculum, an aquatic gastropod mollusc in the family Ampullariidae, the apple snails.

Distribution
P. catamarcensis is endemic to Peru.

References

catamarcensis
Molluscs of South America
Fauna of Peru
Gastropods described in 1875